México 2000 is a 1983 Mexican science fiction comedy film directed by Rogelio A. González.

Plot
The film is set in an utopic Mexico City in 2000. It is composed by a series of sarcastic stories where the characters remember what once were the problems facing the country during the 1980s, such as education, family, security, transportation and politics. The film covers the lifestyle on 2000 where the characters are remembering how Mexico was just a few decades ago, with many social and political problems. In the first year of the twenty-first century all the inhabitants are unemployed, there are no homeless, no poverty, 3 languages are spoken, primary agricultural products are exported all over the world, the Americans emigrate to Mexico, and foreigners travel to study there. Likewise, the Mexican culture has spread around the world; it is the culture of the world's greatest power. Anyway, Mexicans are enthusiastic, disciplined, studious people; there is no racism or poverty or social inequality. There is no corruption, no pollution, no unemployment.

Cast
Chucho Salinas		
Héctor Lechuga		
Rojo Grau	
Elizabeth Aguilar
Miguel Gurza
Humberto Gurza		
Jacqueline Hivet		
Dora Elsa Olea
Tina Romero
Lourdes Salinas
Arturo Adonay
Paco Moraita

References

External links

1983 films
Mexican science fiction comedy films
1980s Spanish-language films
1980s science fiction comedy films
Films set in 2000
Films set in the future
Films directed by Rogelio A. González
1983 comedy films
1980s Mexican films